CRI Darhan at 103.7 FM is a radio station in Darhan, Mongolia. It is part of China Radio International.  It broadcasts primarily in English. According to China Radio International, this is the second overseas radio station launch after CRI Nairobi Kenya 91.9 FM.

External links
 Official CRI Darhan 103.7 schedule

References

Radio stations in Mongolia
China Radio International